Dwight James is a Barbadian international footballer who plays for Notre Dame, as a defender.

Career
James played for the Barbadian national team between 2004 and 2007.

References

1978 births
Living people
Barbadian footballers
Barbados international footballers
Notre Dame SC players
Association football defenders
Youth Milan FC players